Blind is a Dutch, English, and German surname. Notable people with the surname include:

 Daley Blind (born 1990), Dutch footballer
 Danny Blind (born 1961), Dutch footballer and coach
 Karl Blind (1826–1907), German revolutionist and writer
 Knut Blind (born 1965), German economist
 Mathilde Blind (1841–1896, born as Mathilda Cohen), German-English writer
 Roswitha Blind, German mathematician

Dutch-language surnames
English-language surnames
German-language surnames

de:Blind